Michael John Smith (born 17 October 1991) is an English footballer who plays as a striker for League One club Sheffield Wednesday.

Career

Darlington
Born in Wallsend, Tyne and Wear, Smith made his debut in the Football League on 5 April 2010, replacing Chris Moore in the 77th minute of Darlington's 1–0 home defeat by Hereford United in League Two. He scored his first Football League goal on 1 May, in the 79th minute of Darlington's 2–0 away win at Macclesfield Town.

He joined Conference North club Workington on loan for a month on 29 October 2010, and made seven appearances before returning to Darlington. In his first four Conference matches back with Darlington he scored six goals. At the end of the season, he, Phil Gray and John McReady all signed new two-year contracts.

Charlton
After trials with Watford and Stoke City, and an unsuccessful bid of £80,000 from Bristol City, Smith signed a three-year contract with League One club Charlton Athletic on 31 August 2011; the fee was undisclosed He made his Charlton debut against FC Halifax Town in the FA Cup: he came on in the 87th minute and crossed for Bradley Pritchard to score the fourth goal of the match.

On 18 January 2012, Smith joined League Two club Accrington Stanley on loan to the end of the season. Ten days later, he scored a hat-trick and provided an assist for Luke Joyce as Stanley beat Gillingham 4–3. He returned to his parent club in mid-March after suffering a season-ending knee injury.

On 14 August 2012, Smith made his first startand what proved to be last appearancefor Charlton Athletic in a League Cup defeat to Leyton Orient. He then began a series of loan spells. In November, he joined Newport County of the Conference Premier on a one-month loan, and scored against Cambridge United on his debut. The loan was extended for a second month. On 8 March 2013, he joined League One club Colchester United, also for a month.

In July 2013, Smith signed for League Two club AFC Wimbledon on loan until 1 January 2014. Wearing the number 9 shirt, he made his debut on the opening day of the 2013–14 season in a 1–1 draw with Torquay United. He was a regular in the side, finishing his loan period with 10 goals from 25 appearances.

Swindon Town
On 22 January 2014, Smith signed for Swindon Town for an initial £100,000. He scored Swindon's first and third goals as they beat Shrewsbury Town 3–1 on his debut three days later.

Portsmouth
On the final day of the January 2016 transfer window, Smith joined League Two club Portsmouth on a three-month loan. The move was made permanent at the end of the season for an undisclosed fee. He scored a hat-trick against Yeovil Town in an EFL Trophy tie on 30 August, though Portsmouth lost the match 4–3.

Bury
On 31 August 2017, Smith signed a two-year contract with Bury of League One.

Rotherham United
On 11 January 2018, Smith signed for fellow League One club Rotherham United for an undisclosed fee.

After an impressive month in which he scored five goals, assisting two others in five matches, Smith was awarded the EFL League One Player of the Month Award for October 2021. Smith won the award for the second time in the season for January 2022 after scoring four of Rotherham's five goals across the month with the fifth being an own goal deflected in from his shot. 

He was named as the side's Player of the Season for 2021–22, having scored 24 goals in all competitions at the time of the award.

Sheffield Wednesday
On 22 June 2022, it was announced that Smith had joined Sheffield Wednesday on a free transfer following the expiration of his Rotherham United contract. Smith made his Wednesday debut, against Portsmouth on 30 July 2022 coming off the bench for George Byers. His first goal would come against Bradford City in the EFL Trophy from the penalty spot. Following is first goal he would score back-to-back League One goals against Morecambe and Ipswich Town which would see him win Wednesday's September player of the month award.

Career statistics

Honours
Rotherham United
League One runner-up: 2021–22; play-offs: 2018
EFL Trophy: 2021–22

Individual
EFL League One Player of the Month: October 2021, January 2022
Rotherham United Player of the Season: 2021–22

References

External links

1991 births
Living people
Sportspeople from Wallsend
Footballers from Tyne and Wear
English footballers
Association football forwards
Wallsend Boys Club players
Darlington F.C. players
Workington A.F.C. players
Charlton Athletic F.C. players
Accrington Stanley F.C. players
Newport County A.F.C. players
Colchester United F.C. players
AFC Wimbledon players
Swindon Town F.C. players
Barnsley F.C. players
Portsmouth F.C. players
Northampton Town F.C. players
Bury F.C. players
Rotherham United F.C. players
Sheffield Wednesday F.C. players
English Football League players
National League (English football) players